Fermentimonas caenicola is a Gram-negative bacterium from the genus Fermentimonas.

References

External links
Type strain of Fermentimonas caenicola at BacDive -  the Bacterial Diversity Metadatabase

Bacteroidia
Bacteria described in 2016